Boni is a department or commune of Tuy Province in Burkina Faso.

References 

Departments of Burkina Faso
Tuy Province